Gerhard Potma (29 August 1967, in Sneek – 31 March 2006, in Sneek) was a sailor from the Netherlands, who represented his country at the 1992 Summer Olympics in Barcelona. Potma as crew in the Dutch  Flying Dutchman with his brother, Willem Potma, as helmsman took the 18th place. In 1996 Potma returned to the Olympics in Savannah. Again with his brother as helmsman and Frank Hettinga as crew. Potma took 15th place in the Soling.

Further reading

1992 Olympics (Barcelona)

1996 Olympics (Savannah)

References

External links
 
 
 

1969 births
2006 deaths
Dutch windsurfers
Dutch male sailors (sport)
Olympic sailors of the Netherlands
Sailors at the 1992 Summer Olympics – Flying Dutchman
Sailors at the 1996 Summer Olympics – Soling
People from Sneek
Sportspeople from Friesland
20th-century Dutch people